HD 47536 is a single star in the southern constellation of Canis Major. It has an orange hue and is dimly visible to the naked eye with an apparent visual magnitude of +5.25. The star is located at a distance of approximately 408 light years from the Sun based on parallax. It is drifting further away with a radial velocity of 80 km/s.

This is an aging, metal-poor giant star with a stellar classification of K1 III. It is about 9.3 billion years old with 94% of the mass of the Sun. Having exhausted the supply of hydrogen at its core, the star cooled and expanded to 23 times the Sun's radius. The star is spinning slowly, taking  to complete its sidereal rotation. It is radiating 177 times the luminosity of the Sun from its swollen photosphere at an effective temperature of 4,384 K. As of 2015, at least one planet is known to orbit this star.

Planetary system 
A planetary companion to this star, HD 47536 b, was discovered in 2003 by a team led by J. Setiawan. A second planet, HD 47536 c, was claimed in 2007. However, a follow-up study by Soto et al. in 2015 failed to detect the signal of the second planet, so it remains unconfirmed.

See also 
 HD 122430
 List of extrasolar planets

References

External links 

K-type giants
Planetary systems with one confirmed planet
Canis Major
Durchmusterung objects
047536
031688
2447